The Intrepid Four were a group of Navy seamen who grew to oppose what they called "the American aggression in Vietnam" and publicly deserted from the USS Intrepid in October 1967 as it docked in Japan during the Vietnam War. They were among the first American troops whose desertion was publicly announced during the War and the first within the U.S. Navy. The fact that it was a group, and not just an individual, made it more newsworthy.

Background
Rates of desertion by American troops were extremely high during the Vietnam War, with the New York Times reporting in 1974 that there had been 503,926 desertions from the U.S. military up to that point in the war. This vastly exceeded the number of deserters during World War II. By 1966, the desertion rate was 8.43 per thousand, which markedly increased to 33.9 per thousand in 1971. Desertion in Japan was considered particularly challenging due to the language barrier between US troops and Japanese citizens and the differences in appearances, which caused American troops to stand out. About 1,000 US citizens went to Sweden as draft evaders or deserters between April 1967 and March 1973.

Desertion
The four were Craig W. Anderson, John Barilla, Richard Bailey, and Michael Lindner (who later changed his last name to Sutherland). Bailey and Lindner were 19, while Anderson and Barilla were 20 on October 23, 1967 when they decided not to return to their ship at the end of their day-long shore leave. They destroyed their military identification and uniforms. They eventually made contact with the Japanese peace group Beheiren. These were the first American soldiers that Beheiren helped desert. In 1967 and 1968 they would help as many as 17 other U.S. deserters, including Terry Whitmore who deserted in 1968. Beheiren asked the Soviet Embassy for help moving the seamen out of Japan. The Soviet Union agreed, with the intention of using the desertion for anti-Vietnam War propaganda. To pressure the Soviets to treat the four Americans well, Beheiren arranged a press conference in Tokyo in November 1967. During the press conference, they played a documentary film they created by interviewing the four sailors. They released a public statement on November 17, saying, "We four...are against all aggressive wars in general and are against the American aggression in Vietnam in particular. We oppose the continuing increase of military might of the USA in Vietnam and other countries of Southeast Asia. We consider it a crime for a technologically developed country to be engaged in the murder of civilians and to be destroying a small developing, agricultural country." They were then smuggled into the USSR, where they stayed for about a month. In December 1967, the four arrived in Sweden.

Many years later, Mike Sutherland (originally Lindner) wrote more about the Four's decision. They were all stationed onboard the USS Intrepid off the coast of Vietnam. Sutherland explained, "I saw with my own eyes the enormous quantity of bombs that our planes hurled on the Vietnamese.... All this caused me to think about the nature of the war. I understood that thousands of people were dying. These airplanes were wiping villages from the face of the earth, destroying cities, burning children with napalm." He soon met others onboard who felt as he did. "We finally came to the conclusion that staying in the military, knowing how we felt, would be a crime against humanity."

Aftermath
On January 9, 1968, Sweden granted the four Americans humanitarian asylum. They were not the first American deserters to arrive there, but were the first to receive international press coverage through doing so. Sweden's acceptance of American deserters was viewed with hostility by the US, who saw it as directly undermining the war effort. Swedish-American diplomacy was significantly damaged. In 1970, Anderson left Sweden and went to Canada, sneaking across the border into the US. In March 1972, Anderson was arrested by the FBI in San Francisco and imprisoned for eight months. He was given a bad conduct discharge from the Navy in November 1972. As of 2016, Barilla was living in Canada, and Bailey and Lindner still lived in Sweden.

Ironically, the ship they deserted from has become a floating museum permanently docked in New York City where one of the onboard exhibits is called "Dissent On Board" and tells the story of the Intrepid Four.

See also

 A Matter of Conscience
 Brian Willson
 Concerned Officers Movement
 Court-martial of Howard Levy
 Donald W. Duncan
 FTA Show – 1971 anti-Vietnam War road show for GIs
 F.T.A. – documentary film about the FTA Show
 Fort Hood Three
 GI's Against Fascism
 GI Coffeehouses
 GI Underground Press
 Movement for a Democratic Military
 Opposition to United States involvement in the Vietnam War
 Presidio mutiny
 Sir! No Sir!, a documentary about the antiwar movement within the ranks of the United States Armed Forces
 Stop Our Ship (SOS)
 The Spitting Image, a 1998 book by Vietnam veteran and sociology professor Jerry Lembcke which disproves the widely believed narrative that American soldiers were spat upon and insulted by antiwar protesters
 Veterans For Peace
 Vietnam Veterans Against the War
 Waging Peace in Vietnam
 Winter Soldier Investigation

External links
 Sir! No Sir!, a film about GI resistance to the Vietnam War
 A Matter of Conscience - GI Resistance During the Vietnam War
 Waging Peace in Vietnam - US Soldiers and Veterans Who Opposed the War

References

Opposition to United States involvement in the Vietnam War
Deserters
United States Navy personnel of the Vietnam War